Khattab (also Romanized as Khaţţāb and Khaţāb; also known as Khatāb-e Sheykh) is a village in Garmkhan Rural District, Garmkhan District, Bojnord County, North Khorasan Province, Iran. At the 2006 census, its population was 116, in 33 families.

References 

Populated places in Bojnord County